Upper World and similar may refer to:

In mythology:
Upper World (Greek), in Greek mythology, the land where people live, as opposed to the Underworld
Upper World ("Heaven"), in Hungarian mythology, where the gods and good souls live
the Upper World, where the Aiy (benevolent spirits) live, in Yakut mythology

In religion:
Urdhva Loka, the upper world, in Jain cosmology
the Seven Logas or Upper Worlds of Ayyavazhi (a Hindu sect) mythology

Other:
Upper World (film), a 1934 drama starring Warren William and Ginger Rogers

See also
Overworld (disambiguation)
Underworld (disambiguation)